Mi amor por ti, is a Mexican telenovela produced by Ernesto Alonso and originally transmitted by Teleprogramas Acapulco, SA.

Cast 
María Rivas
Guillermo Murray
Anita Blanch
José Carlos Ruiz as Roque

References

External links 

Mexican telenovelas
Televisa telenovelas
Spanish-language telenovelas
1969 telenovelas
1969 Mexican television series debuts
1969 Mexican television series endings